Cristian Villagra (born 27 December 1985) is an Argentine professional footballer who plays as a left-back for Argentine Primera División side Atlético Tucumán.

Club career
Villagra began his career with Rosario Central in 2005, his form bringing him to the attention of River Plate. During the 2007 January transfer window, Villagra was signed by River as part of deal that also saw Juan Ojeda and Marco Rubén switch from Rosario Central to River Plate.

International career
Villagra was called up to the national team for a friendly against Scotland on November 19, 2008, however he did not leave the bench. On May 5, 2010, he finally made his first appearance for the national team in a friendly against Haiti.

Personal life
Villagra's brother, Rodrigo, is also a professional footballer. Their brother, Gonzalo, died from leukemia in June 2018; after Cristian had donated bone marrow in the preceding February.

Titles

References

External links
 Player profile on the River Plate website 
 Argentine Primera statistics at Fútbol XXI 

1985 births
Living people
Sportspeople from Córdoba Province, Argentina
Argentine footballers
Argentine expatriate footballers
Expatriate footballers in Ukraine
Association football wingers
Argentine Primera División players
Ukrainian Premier League players
Rosario Central footballers
Club Atlético River Plate footballers
FC Metalist Kharkiv players
Atlético Tucumán footballers
Argentina international footballers
Argentine expatriate sportspeople in Ukraine